Stephen Sasagi is a NZ rugby union player who in the past has played for the Tasman Makos in the Air New Zealand Cup and North Otago in the Heartland Championship.

Early years
Stephen Sasagi played for his Otago Boys High School 1st XV as a Lock in 2002. While playing his club rugby for Alhambra Union (2004–2007) he was selected for the Samoa U21 side to play in the Under 21 World Cup in Argentina and was part of the Under-21 team that faced Ireland in 2005.

North Otago
Stephen Sasagi played on the wing when playing for North Otago and was a vital part of the 2007 North Otago side that won the Meads Cup. He brought pace to the team, and scored a number of tries along the way.

Tasman Makos
Stephen Sasagi joined the Makos for the 2008 season. Although he only had two appearances, he managed to score his sole try for the union against Taranaki.

Wellington
He currently attends Victoria University of Wellington at the School of Architecture and Design and is working his way towards a Bachelor of Design. Sasagi is currently playing as a Loose Forward for the Tawa Rugby Club in the Wellington Club Competition.

Notes

New Zealand rugby union players
Living people
1985 births
Place of birth missing (living people)
North Otago rugby union players
Rugby union wings